Calathodes is a genus of flowering plants belonging to the family Ranunculaceae.

Its native range is Himalaya to Taiwan.

Species:

Calathodes oxycarpa 
Calathodes palmata 
Calathodes polycarpa 
Calathodes unciformis

References

Ranunculaceae
Ranunculaceae genera